The 2021–22 Siena Saints men's basketball team represented Siena College in the 2021–22 NCAA Division I men's basketball season. The Saints, led by third-year head coach Carmen Maciariello, played their home games at MVP Arena in Albany, New York as members of the Metro Atlantic Athletic Conference.

Previous season
The Saints finished the 2020–21 season 12–5, 12–4 in MAAC play to finish as MAAC regular season co-champions alongside Monmouth. As the #1 seed in the MAAC tournament, they were upset by #9 seed Iona in the quarterfinals.

Roster

Schedule and results

|-
!colspan=12 style=""| Exhibition

|-
!colspan=12 style=""| Regular season

|-
!colspan=9 style=""| MAAC tournament

Source

References

Siena Saints men's basketball seasons
Siena Saints
Siena Saints men's basketball
Siena Saints men's basketball